Dara Ó Briain: School of Hard Sums is a British comedy game show about the subject of mathematics and it is based on the Japanese show Comaneci University Mathematics. The programme is broadcast on Dave and is presented by Dara Ó Briain and stars Marcus du Sautoy. Each episode is themed and Ó Briain, along with a guest or guests, attempts to solve various conundrums set by du Sautoy. At the end of each episode, Ó Briain sets homework questions for viewers; the answers can be checked on the show's website.

Transmissions

Episodes
A pilot episode was produced with the title Dara O'Briain's University of Practical Mathematics, but this was never broadcast.

The coloured backgrounds denote the result of each of the shows:

Series 1

Series 2

Series 3

Reaction
Readers of UKGameshows.com named it on a two way tie, the seventh best new game show of 2012 in their "Hall of fame" poll.

References

External links

2010s British comedy television series
2012 British television series debuts
2014 British television series endings
Dave (TV channel) original programming
English-language television shows